Haim Bar (born 14 May 1954) is a former Israeli footballer who spent his entire career playing for Maccabi Netanya.

Honours
Israeli Premier League:
Winner (4): 1973–74, 1977–78, 1979–80, 1982–83
Runner-up (3): 1974-75, 1981–82, 1987–88
Israel State Cup:
Winner (1): 1977-78
Israeli Supercup:
Winner (4): 1973-74, 1977–78, 1979–80, 1982-83
UEFA Intertoto Cup:
Winner (4): 1978, 1980, 1983, 1984
Toto Cup:
Runner-up (2): 1986-87, 1988–89

References

External links

1954 births
Living people
Israeli footballers
Israel international footballers
Maccabi Netanya F.C. players
People from Netanya
Olympic footballers of Israel
Footballers at the 1976 Summer Olympics
Association football defenders
Israeli Football Hall of Fame inductees